Diesel & Power is punk rock/hard rock band Backyard Babies' first studio album. It was released in 1994. In 2006, it was re-released on their own label Billion Dollar Babies with the bonus track "Lies."

Track listing  

"Smell the Magic" – 2:20
"Bad to the Bone" – 2:59
"Strange Kind of Attitude" – 4:45
"Diesel and Power" – 4:39
"Love" – 3:53
"Wild Dog" – 3:24
"Fly Like a Little..." – 4:27
"Electric Suzy" – 3:16
"Kickin' Up Dust" – 4:17
"Should I Be Damned" – 4:14
"Fill Up This Bad Machine" – 3:10
"Heaven in Hell" – 4:58
"Shame" – 7:52
2006 reissue bonus track
"Lies" – 4:51

1994 albums
Backyard Babies albums